Furazan, or 1,2,5-oxadiazole, is a heterocyclic aromatic organic compound consisting of a five-atom ring containing 1 oxygen and 2 nitrogen atoms.  The furazan ring system is also found in the steroid furazabol. Furazan and its derivatives are obtained from the oxime derivatives of 1,2-diketones.

Synthesis
In theory the simplest means of producing furazan is the cyclic-dehydration of glyoxime (the di-oxime of glyoxal), however the instability of furazan to high temperature or extremes of pH requires that this process be performed carefully. The formation of furazan from glyoxime is also exothermic and takes place with the copious evolution of noxious gases. The reaction may be achieved by heating glyoxime to 150 °C in the presence of succinic anhydride; furazan will evaporate at this temperature and thus is continuously removed from the reaction mixture.

Derivatives
3,4-Dimethylfurazan
3,4-Dimethylfurazan (b.p. 154–159 °C) is prepared by an analogous process by dehydrating dimethylglyoxime. A variety of related derivatives are known, including diphenyl- and methylethylfurazan.

Carboxylic acid derivatives
Potassium permanganate oxidizes 3,4-dimethylfurazan first to methylfurazancarboxylic acid and then to furazandicarboxylic acid. By warming oxyfurazan acetic acid with excess of potassium permanganate, oxyfurazancarboxylic acid is obtained. It crystallizes as prisms (m.p. 175 °C).  Furazancarboxylic acid (m.p. 107 °C) is prepared by oxidation of furazanpropionic acid with potassium permanganate. It dissolves in base to give nitrosocyanacetate.

Diaminofurazan
The energetic precursor, diaminofurazan, can be prepared by heating diaminoglyoxime with potassium hydroxide followed by cooling to give white crystals. Like many other furazans, diaminofurazan forms stable complexes with copper(II) salts.

Furoxan
Furoxan may be formed by dimerization of nitrile oxides

References

Oxadiazoles